An athletic supporter is an individual who spends time with athletes at the Collegiate and Professional level, but are not athletes themselves.  The term often used pejoratively by families of athletes describing the "groupies" that often are around athletes.

Athletic supporter may also refer to:
Jockstrap, men's undergarment designed for use in sports
Booster club, contributes money to an associated club, sports team, or organization